The Jordanian Hashemite Fund for Human Development (JOHUD) is the largest and oldest development NGO in Jordan. With 450 employees and around 4000 volunteers (as of 2014), the group maintains a strong presence in Jordan's poorest communities through a network of 51 community centres. JOHUD's work is primarily concerned  with poverty reduction, women's rights, creating opportunities for young people, and defending human rights.

History 
The Jordanian Hashemite Fund for Human Development was first created in 1977 by royal decree. Originally named the Queen Alia Fund, the group was created with a broad mandate and substantial levels of official support; the Board of Trustees was made up largely of high-level government officials and was chaired by the Crown Princess, HRH Princess Basma bint Talal. In 1979, the fund was granted special legal status as a non-governmental institution with the right to enjoy a degree of administrative and financial independence.

The fund's early years were dominated by research and policymaking, with limited projects that distributed gifts, in-kind assistance and humanitarian aid to impoverished communities. In 1984, the Fund created its first Community Development Centres in Madaba (a form of community engagement that would become the hallmark of the group). QAF CDCs began springing up throughout the country during the 1980s, delivering aid and services to communities that were otherwise on the periphery of society. Throughout this period, the Fund also began creating Jordan's first women's committees, as a means of allowing rural women to take more decisive political roles in local communities. In this period, the community centres also began hosting the country's first kindergartens.

In 1989, the Fund created  a new organisation under its umbrella: the Queen Zein al Sharaf Institute for Development (ZENID). The new organisation aimed to share and diffuse the development expertise that the Fund had collected via training sessions and publications. In 1991, the Fund introduced the new National Philanthropy Campaign (later renamed the Goodwill Campaign), which began delivering organised humanitarian aid, medical aid and other donations to impoverished communities throughout Jordan. As international development thought gravitated toward sustainable models, the Fund also began investing in new microcredit schemes from 1996. The Small Business Development Centre (now named the Small Business Unit) eventually became the first group in Jordan to offer Islamic microcredit, a novel means of offering credit in a way that conforms with the Islamic prohibition on charging interest.

In 2002, JOHUD created another sub-organisation dedicated to the rights of young people. The Princess Basma Youth Resource Centre (PBYRC) is now the group's busiest programme leader, and its success has seen the group shift its priorities toward combating the structural issue of youth unemployment and poor civic engagement. Now holding the view that youth unemployment and marginalisation is the greatest barrier to development in Jordan, JOHUD has officially declared youth issues to be one of the group's biggest priorities, alongside its traditional focus on poverty and women's rights.

Sub-Organisations and Programmes 
JOHUD is the largest development NGO of its kind in Jordan, and has created a number of organisations and initiatives under its umbrella.

The Community Development Centre Network 
Since the 1980s, JOHUD has been able to provide services for remote and underserved communities via a unique network of 51 community centres in 11 out of Jordan's 12 governorates. The community centres (locally called Princess Basma Centres) typically provide training and awareness sessions, income projects for women, community committees, and aid for impoverished families. The network also relies largely on the work of volunteers, with thousands offering their expertise in ICT, English language training, disability care, and many other field.

The Princess Basma Youth Resource Centre (PBYRC) 
The PBYRC was created in 2002 to create youth programmes for Jordan's substantial unemployed or marginalised youth populations. The group has so far created Radio Farah al Nas (a community radio station that focuses on women's rights, youth issues, and providing helpful information for refugees), three employability centres, three ICT clubhouses, debate clubs, film clubs, science labs, and other miscellaneous programmes that teach life and work skills. The busy centre works exclusively with young 10-24 year old Jordanians from a range of backgrounds.

Goodwill Campaign 
The Goodwill Campaign was created in 1991 to share humanitarian and medical aid with impoverished communities in Jordan. The campaign runs a number of events throughout the country every year, typically providing free medical days, financial funding for scholarships, or toys, winter items, food, and other forms of in-kind assistance. Along with providing more immediate assistance, JOHUD also runs separate projects that tackle the source of poverty in Jordan; the Pockets of Poverty programme specifically tackles the extreme poverty found in the poorest areas through microcredit loans, infrastructure repair, and business skills classes.

Natural Resource Management Programme 
A number of JOHUD projects under the NRM label aim to help Jordan overcome its structural water scarcity issues. The programmes have so far helped tens of thousands of Jordanians in water-scarce areas by repairing aging infrastructure, training local women on how to fix home piping, and donating new water tanks.

Al-Rajaa School and al-Mutah Special Education Centre 
JOHUD has created some of Jordan's first and only education centres for disabled people. Al-Rajaa School for the Deaf was created in 1983 to provide a specialised curriculum for deaf students in which alternatives to sign language could be promoted (helping students to rejoin the wider community). Al-Mutah Special Education Centre in Karak is also geared toward helping disabled people engage more broadly in the community, offering lessons teaching work skills to disabled adults or social skills lessons for those with autism or other mental issues.

The Queen Zein al-Sharaf Institute for Development (ZENID) 
The ZENID centre was created in 1989 to serve as a regional hub for development knowledge sharing. Today, ZENID conducts regular research projects, offers regular training sessions to community groups and partners, maintains a library of development knowledge and records, and hosts major regional conferences. The ZENID complex also hosts the PBYRC, Radio Farah al Nas, and JOHUD's ICT clubhouse in Amman.

Small Business Unit 
Previously called the Small Business Development Centre, the Small Business Unit provides microcredit loans for the entrepreneurial poor throughout Jordan. Those looking for a small loan with which to start up a business are invited to apply, and all finance is provided in accordance with Islamic law (thus encouraging devout Muslims who would otherwise avoid banks to seek the capital necessary to launch their ideas).

Queen Alia Competition 
The Queen Alia competition is an annual competition that has been held since 1995. It aims to raise awareness of prominent issues (like national development, water, health, the environment, and others) by distributing a questionnaire to schools and community centres throughout the country. Participants are invited to research the subject at hand and submit their answers to the competition, for prizes up to 2000 Jordanian Dinars in value. A sub-competition, the Jo-Green Competition, also invites engineering students to submit eco-friendly architectural plans for buildings. The competitions are significantly well known in Jordan, attracting approximately 650,000 entries per year.

Philosophy 
On its official website, JOHUD states that its overall aim is to create a society in which all Jordanians have:
 The right to a stable livelihood that provides individuals and their families with the quality of life they deserve
 The right to a secure living environment, free from the dangers associated with poverty-related social vulnerability
 The right to personal agency, meaning that all Jordanians have the ability to affect decisions that impact their lives
 The right to access the resources needed to ensure self-reliance and social mobility for all.

References

External links
 Official website

Charities based in Jordan
Organizations established in 1977
Disability organisations based in Jordan